Kharbu is a village in Drass tehsil in Kargil district of the Indian union territory of Ladakh. The village is located 26 kilometres from the district and tehsil headquarters Kargil.

Demographics
According to the 2011 census of India, Kharbu has 145 households. The literacy rate of Kharbu village is 79.23%. In Kharbu, Male literacy stands at 93.58% while the female literacy rate was 64.29%.

Transport

Road
Kharbu is well-connected by road to other places in Ladakh and India by the Srinagar-Leh Highway or the NH 1.

Rail
The nearest railway station to Kharbu is the Srinagar railway station located at a distance of 201 kilometres.

Air
The nearest airport is at Kargil located at a distance of 35 kilometres but it is currently non-operational. The next nearest major airports are Srinagar International Airport and Leh Airport located at a distance of 198 kilometres and 241 kilometres.

See also
Ladakh
Kargil
Suru Valley
Drass

References

Villages in Drass tehsil